Grammatostomias flagellibarba is a species of barbeled dragonfish.  They live at depths of up to 1,500 m (5,000 ft) below the surface and usually measure up to 15.2 cm (6 in) in length.

Type specimen and description
The type specimen was caught in a shrimp trawl by the Helga on 12 November 1909 at 51° 20' N, 11° 56' W, southwest of Ireland. They were trawling over bottom 736 fathoms (4416 ft) deep, but "the net never touched bottom, and probably did not go deeper than 700 fathoms" (4200 ft).

It is black and possesses a chin barbel that is about six times as long as the body, a large photophore behind and just below each eye, and two rows of very small photophores on each side of the body.

Distribution
It is found in the North Atlantic, specifically off southern Ireland and in the Bay of Biscay.

References

Stomiidae
Fish described in 1910